Dagoberto Alexis Currimilla Gómez (born December 26, 1987) is a Chilean footballer who plays as right midfielder for Deportes Valdivia.

Club career
This player came out of the lower divisions of the club and was promoted to the First Team in 2005, the same year he made his debut with the steel shirt.

International career
Currimilla has played national as part of the Sub-20, and has participated in the 2007 South American Youth Championship and also participated in the 2007 FIFA U-20 World Cup, played in Canada, where Chile achieved third place.

Honours
Unión Española
Primera División (1): 2013
Supercopa de Chile (1): 2013

References

External links

Dagoberto Currimilla at playmakerstats.com (English version of ceroacero.es)

1987 births
Living people
Chilean footballers
Chile under-20 international footballers
C.D. Huachipato footballers
Santiago Morning footballers
Unión Española footballers
Deportes Valdivia footballers
Chilean Primera División players
Primera B de Chile players
Segunda División Profesional de Chile players
People from Valdivia
Chilean people of Mapuche descent
Mapuche sportspeople
Indigenous sportspeople of the Americas
Association football midfielders